Sara Learns Manners (Swedish: Sara lär sig folkvett) is a 1937 Swedish comedy film directed by Gustaf Molander and starring Tutta Rolf, Emma Meissner and Aino Taube. It was shot at the Råsunda Studios in Stockholm. The film's sets were designed by the art director Arne Åkermark.

Synopsis
Sara works as a maid in the middle-class Haller family, a widow and her three grown-up children. When Sara unexpectedly inherits a fortune from a rich uncle in Australia, Madame Haller believes she is still to naive to go out in the world with her newfound wealth and convinces her to stay as a guest in their house until they can teach her how a lady should behave.

Cast
 Tutta Rolf as 	Sara Holm
 Emma Meissner as 	Eva Haller
 Aino Taube as Monika Haller
 Håkan Westergren as 	Teddy Haller
 Kotti Chave as Georg Haller
 Wiktor Andersson as 	Johan, house-servant
 Jullan Jonsson as 	Hulda, cook
 Olga Andersson as Terese Berg
 Millan Bolander as 	Maid Anna
 Carl Browallius as 	Publisher 
 Artur Cederborgh as 	Mr. Berg
 Gösta Cederlund as 	Banker
 Georg Fernqvist as Jeweller
 Folke Helleberg as 	Automobile Salesman 
 Carl Ström as Gyllenberg, banker 
 Åke Uppström as 	Student

References

Bibliography 
 Qvist, Per Olov & von Bagh, Peter. Guide to the Cinema of Sweden and Finland. Greenwood Publishing Group, 2000.

External links 
 

1937 films
Swedish comedy films
1937 comedy films
1930s Swedish-language films
Films directed by Gustaf Molander
1930s Swedish films